A sacred tree is a tree which is considered to be sacred, or worthy of spiritual respect or reverence. Such trees appear throughout world history in various cultures including the ancient Hindu mythology, Greek, Celtic and Germanic mythologies. They also continue to hold profound meaning in contemporary culture in places like Japan (shinboku), Korea (dangsan namu), India (bodhi tree), and the Philippines, among others. Tree worship is core part of religions which include aspects of animism as core elements of their belief, which is the eco-friendly belief that trees, forests, rivers, mountains, etc have a life force ('anime' i.e. alive) and need to be conserved and used in a sustainable manner.

An example of the continued importance of sacred trees in contemporary urban culture is the 700-year old camphor growing in the middle of Kayashima Station. Locals protested against moving the tree when the railway station had to be expanded, so the station was built around it. The sacred Banyan tree is the national tree of India, and the Bodhi Tree under which the Buddha is said to have meditated in Bodh Gaya, is also revered as sacred.

Sacred trees are some times planted in the sacred groves, which can also have other type of trees too.

Sacred trees in  mythology 

Trees in mythology are the trees that appear in the folklore genre of myth.

Sacred trees and plants by religion and regions

European Pagan Religions

Celtic

Germanic

Serbian 

Zapis are the sacred tree in Serbian tradition.

Christianity
Many trees, groves and gardens are considered sacred inside Christianity. Most notably the Gethsemane, the location where Jesus was betrayed by Judas Iscariot (agony in the Garden) according to the bible. The garden thereby became a common pilgrimage site. Saints associated with specific trees and locations also became pilgrimage sites in early Chirstanity.

Indic religions

In the Dharmic (Indian-origin) religions, such as Hinduism, Buddhism, Jainism and Sikhism, the ecology, such as trees, rivers, fauna, and mountain, is sacred and revered objects of worship. There are numerous sacred groves of India. In Hindu belief, the Kalpavriksha is a wish granting tree. In addition to the Panchvati trees described below, other sacred trees include species such as the Akshayavat (sacred fig tree), Banana leaf, Kadamba, Parijaat, and Sandalwood. The Bodhi Tree (banyan) is specially revered, and there are numerous large banyan trees in India. Matsya Purana, a Hindu text, has a Sanskrit language shloka (hymn), which explains the importance of reverence of ecology in Hinduism. It states, "A pond equals ten wells, a reservoir equals ten ponds, while a son equals ten reservoirs, and a tree equals ten sons."

Triveni groves

Triveni is a grove of 3 specific trees sacred to Indian-origin religions (Hinduism, Buddhism and Jainism), which are the vata (ficus indicus, banyan), ashvattha (ficus religiosa, Peepal) and Nimba (azadirachta indica, neem).

Panchavati groves

Panchavati, are groves of five trees sacred to Indian-origin religions, such as Hinduism, Buddhism and Jainism. Panchvati has five types of  sacred trees, however there are more than five types of trees which are considered sacred and form the part of panchavati. Sacred trees used in panchavati are the Vata (ficus benghalensis, Banyan), Ashvattha (ficus religiosa, Peepal), Bilva (aegle marmelos, Bengal Quince), Amalaki (phyllanthus emblica, Indian Gooseberry, Amla), Ashoka (Saraca asoca, Ashok), Udumbara (ficus racemosa, Cluster Fig, Gular), Nimba (Azadirachta indica, Neem) and Shami (prosopis spicigera, Indian Mesquite).

Forests Department, Haryana has initiated a state-wide program to plant panchavati groves in each village, which will be planted along the temples, ponds, and common land. From 2021, land was identified in village for planting these groves which will be looked after by the villagers. Within each grove, peepal will be planted in the east, banyan in north, bel in centre, amla in west and ashoka tree in south.

Sacred plants
The sacred fruits and plants include the Bael, Kusha grass, Tulsi (see Tulasi chaura and Tulsi Vivah), flowers such as Lotus, Champaka, coconut, paan (betal leaf), banana leaf, etc are also sacred. Tulsi in India is cultivated for religious and traditional medicine purposes, and also for its essential oil. It is widely used as a herbal tea, commonly used in Ayurveda, and has a place within the Vaishnava tradition of Hinduism, in which devotees perform worship involving holy basil plants or leaves. The sacred flowers include the Lotus, Champaka and Marigold.

Japan 

Sacred trees, called shinboku, are a deeply ingrained part of a Japanese culture that has historically viewed itself as being united with nature, rather than separate from nature; thus, recognizing the sacredness of trees, stones, mountains, forests, and the elements has been a relatively constant theme in Japanese culture for thousands of years. In the present day Japan, shinboku are trees inhabited by kami (spirits or deities) and can readily be found in many of the 100,000 Shinto shrines existing in throughout the country. Although any tree can technically become a shinboku through a Shinto ritual process of inviting a kami to inhabit it, most shinboku are particularly large or aesthetically interesting examples of endemic species such as camphor, ginkgo, or Japanese cedar. The oldest shinboku are estimated to be several thousands years in age. Because shinboku are viewed as being literal sanctuaries, inhabited by kami, they are protected as a physical and spiritual embodiment of the divine nature. In most cases, Shinboku can be easily identified by the straw or hemp rope called a shimenawa which is typically wrapped around the tree; the rope acts as both a sign of the tree's sacredness, and also as a protective barrier between the spirit world and the human world.

In addition to individual shinboku, shrines and Buddhist temples are often surrounded by sacred forests called Chinju no Mori, which are considered sacred forests where kami, including spirits of ancestors, dwell.

Korea 

In Korea, species such as Zelkova serrata, Pinus koraiensis, and Ginkgo biloba, have been considered a symbol of protection for villages since ancient times, and can still be found planted at central points in cities, towns and villages around the country. The trees, referred to as dangsan namu (god tree) often stand next to small pavilions, serving both as shaded informal gathering points, and spaces for traditional rituals and ceremonies involving prayer and offerings to the tree. The oldest of these trees are estimated to be in excess of 1,000 years in age, and are protected as natural monuments by Korean law.

In 2013, the Korea Forest Research Institute announced a project to clone the sacred zelkova, pine, and ginkgo trees that are identified as natural monuments, so their lineage will not be lost in case of disaster or death due to age.

Philippines 

Bathala, the indigenous religious beliefs of the Philippines practiced in pre-colonial Philippines, is a mix of Hindu-Buddhist and native belief in spirits such as anitos. Indigenous Philippine shrines and sacred grounds host the sacred trees.

.

Gallery

See also
Sacred groves
Sacred mountains
Sacred natural site
Sacred rivers
Sacred site

References

Further reading
 
 

Trees in religion
Sacred natural sites